Sanford Allen (born 1939) is an American classical violinist. At the age of 10, he began studying violin at the Juilliard School of Music and continued at the Mannes School of Music under Vera Fonaroff. He was the first African-American regular member of the Lewisohn Stadium Concerts  Orchestra, joining in the summer of 1959. In 1962, shortly after winning the inaugural Young Concert Artists competition, he became the first full-time African-American violinist with the New York Philharmonic. After leaving the Philharmonic in 1977, Allen pursued a career as a soloist, teacher, and adviser on the arts. He also worked extensively recording film music.

Allen has been married to Madhur Jaffrey, the Indian-born actress, food and travel writer, and television personality, since 1969.

Awards

 Federation of Music Clubs (1956) 
 Young Concert Artists competition (1961)
 Koussevitzky International Recording Award (1974)

Discography

With Ron Carter
Super Strings (Milestone, 1981)
With Rahsaan Roland Kirk
Kirkatron (Warner Bros, 1977)

External links
 Sanford Allen, in the first violin section of the New York Philharmonic Orchestra (photograph) Beinecke Library digital collections, object 2029313.

References

1939 births
American classical violinists
Male classical violinists
Living people
21st-century classical violinists
21st-century American male musicians
21st-century African-American musicians
20th-century African-American people
21st-century American violinists